Raphael Sealey (14 August 1927, Middlesbrough, England – 29 November 2013, Berkeley, California) was a classical scholar and ancient historian.

Sealey studied at University College, Oxford in England under George Cawkwell, receiving an M.A. from Oxford University in 1951.

Raphael Sealey was Professor of History at the University of California at Berkeley in California, United States, from 1967 to 2000, specialising in Ancient Greek history and law. On retirement, he became an Emeritus Professor.  Before coming to Berkeley, he had taught at the University College of North Wales, at Queen Mary College, University of London, and at the State University of New York at Buffalo.

Selected books
Sealey's books include:

 A History of the Greek City States, 700-338 B.C. (Oakland: University of California Press, 1976).
 The Athenian Republic (State College: Pennsylvania State University Press, 1987).
 Women and Law in Classical Greece (Chapel Hill: University of North Carolina Press, 1990).
 Demosthenes and His Time (Oxford: Oxford University Press, 1993).
 The Justice of the Greeks (Ann Arbor: University of Michigan Press, 1994).

References

External links
 Raphael Sealey home page

Alumni of University College, Oxford
Classical scholars of the University of California, Berkeley
American classical scholars
Scholars of ancient Greek history
Legal historians
1927 births
2013 deaths
University at Buffalo faculty
Historians from California